Demma Daba (Amharic: ደምማ ዳባ; born 18 January 1989) is an Ethiopian middle distance runner, who specializes in the 1500 metres.

Daba won the bronze medal at the 2008 World Junior Championships. He also competed at the 2008 Olympic Games without progressing to the second round.

His personal best times are:
1500 metres - 3:35.27 min (2008)
3000 metres - 7:42.63 min (2007)

External links

1989 births
Living people
Ethiopian male middle-distance runners
Athletes (track and field) at the 2008 Summer Olympics
Olympic athletes of Ethiopia